Istobal is a Spanish company specialised in the design, manufacturing and selling of car wash equipment.
Headquartered in L'Alcúdia (Valencia), the company has 9 subsidiaries and assembly plants in Spain, France, USA and Brasil.
Istobal markets its products in over 60 countries through its extensive distributors network and its own subsidiaries.
The company has more than 600 employees, most of them based in L´Alcudia (Valencia).

History 
Istobal was founded by D. Ismael Tomás Alacreu in March, 1950. The company started out as a small vehicle repair shop, and it was in this workshop that the founder designed the first lubricating machine. 
The machine was an enormous success and, on the strength of this, Ismael Tomás decided on a new business strategy, leaving behind the vehicle repair world, he entered into the development and manufacturing of lubricating equipment.
 
Istobal started exporting its products for lubrication and car lifts in the 60s and in the 70s Istobal developed its first automatic car wash machine.
 
Products: rollovers, wash tunnels, jet washes, rollovers for commercials, equipment to wash trains and trams, accessories, chemicals and water treatment solutions.

References 
1. ABC  (31-10-2013 / 15:42 h EFE). “http://www.abc.es/agencias/noticia.asp?noticia=1524801." 
2. Las provincias (17.07.12 - 00:28 - S. PARRILLA | L'ALCÚDIA.) “http://www.lasprovincias.es/v/20120717/ribera-costera/empresa-istobal-alcudia-ejemplo-20120717.html." 
3. Expansión (23.01.2012 Valencia A.C.A.) “http://www.expansion.com/2012/01/20/valencia/1327089013.html." 
Istobal has the regulation certificate ISO9001 // ISO14001

Manufacturing companies established in 1950
Automotive companies of Spain
1950 establishments in Spain